Andy Speak (born 21 January 1980) is a former professional rugby league footballer who played in the 1990s and 2000s.

References

External links
Profile at therhinos.co.ukĎŔƑ
(archived by web.archive.org) Profile at leedsrugby
Batley News - Former Dons have trials with BulldogsĎŔƑ
(archived by web.archive.org) Statistics at thecastlefordtigers.co.uk
(archived by web.archive.org) New Profile at therhinos.co.uk New Profile at therhinos.co.uk

1980 births
Living people
Batley Bulldogs players
Castleford Tigers players
Dewsbury Rams players
Doncaster R.L.F.C. players
English rugby league players
Halifax R.L.F.C. players
Leeds Rhinos players
Place of birth missing (living people)
Rugby league hookers
Sheffield Eagles (1984) players
Wakefield Trinity players